Sheila Pree Bright is an Atlanta-based, award-winning American photographer best known for her works Plastic Bodies, Suburbia, Young Americans and her most recent series #1960Now.  Sheila is the author of #1960Now: Photographs of Civil Rights Activist and Black Lives Matter Protest published by Chronicle Books.

Early life and education
Sheila Pree Bright was born in Waycross, GA.  As a member of a military family, she spent her early childhood in Germany and later moved back to the United States, moving between several states including Colorado and Kansas.  None of these locations had significant black populations, a fact that later influenced her work.  She earned a bachelor of science degree from the University of Missouri in 1998. Her initial interest in photography began while taking a photography class during her senior year of college. She moved to Atlanta in 1998 and received a master of fine arts degree from Georgia State University in 2003.

Career
Bright is often described as a "cultural anthropologist."  Her earliest experience as a photographer began when she spent time in Houston where she began photographing the gangsta rap scene and confronting the dynamic between hip hop and gun culture. In 2003, she created her MFA thesis photo series, Plastic Bodies, which was featured in the film Through the Lens Darkly and went viral on Huffington Post in 2013.  In these photographs, she manipulated images of black women and Barbie dolls in an attempt to challenge the western ideals of whiteness and beauty and explore the impact these ideals have on girls and women of color.  Bright later earned national acclaim when she won the Center Prize at the Santa Fe Center of Photography in 2006 for her Suburbia series, which features images of African American suburban life.  In 2008, she had her first solo exhibition at the High Museum of Art, featuring her series Young Americans.  These photographers were a response to the commonly negative portrayals of Millennials. She allowed her subjects to use their own props, clothes, and poses in an attempt to "give them a platform to speak for themselves."

Bright was selected for the Museum of Contemporary of Art of Georgia's Working Artist Project in 2014, during which she created her series 1960Who. In this work, she created portraits of several civil rights activists of the 1960s and 1970s, including Dr. Roslyn Pope, Lonnie King, Herman Russel, Charles Person, and Claire O'Connor. In addition to the museum exhibition, she plastered these portraits on large public walls throughout downtown Atlanta in honor and celebration of their activism.  In 2014 and 2015, Bright visited Ferguson and Baltimore after the murders of Michael Brown and Freddie Gray to photograph and document the protests.  These photos led to her series #1960Now.  Bright’s book, #1960Now, was published by Chronicle Books on October 16, 2018.

#1960Now series is now in the collection of the Smithsonian African American History and Culture Museum, Washington, DC; The High Museum of Art Atlanta; The Center for Civil and Human Rights, Atlanta, GA; City of Atlanta, Mayor's Office of Cultural Affairs and the Pyramid Peak Foundation, Memphis, TN.

Work

Solo exhibitions
2018 Radical Lens, Clark Atlanta  University Art Museum, Atlanta, GA
1960Now, Southeast Museum of Photography, Daytona State College, Daytona Beach, FL
2017 #1960Now: Heroes, Victories and Triumphs, The Gallatin Galleries, New York, NY
1960Now, The Center for Civil and Human Rights, Atlanta, GA
2016 #1960Now: Art + Intersections short film,  Afrikana Independent Film Festival, Richmond, VA
1960Now, Click Triangle Photography Festival, Durham, NC
1960Now, Look3, The Jefferson School African American Heritage Center, Charlottesville, VA
1960Now, Georgia Southwestern State University, Americus, GA
2015 #1960Now, Museum of Contemporary Art, Atlanta, GA
1960Now, Mason Fine Art Gallery, Atlanta, GA
2013 1960 Who,  Public Art series, ELEVATE Atlanta, Atlanta, GA
2014 Young Americans, Burden of Proof: National Identity and the Legacy of War, Oglethorpe University Museum of Art, Atlanta, GA
2011 Young Americans, Sumter County Gallery of Art, Sumter, SC
Girls, Grillz and Dolls: Country Club Projects, Cincinnati, OH
Young Americans, Time Inc, New York, NY
Girls, Grillz and Dolls: Gambling State University, Dunbar Hall Gallery, Gambling, LA
2010 Girls, Grillz and Guns: Sandler Hudson Gallery, Atlanta GA! 2009 
Girls, Grillz and Dolls: Power House Memphis, Memphis, TN
Young Americans, University of California, Irvine, CA
Young Americans, Winston-Salem State University, Winston-Salem, NC
Girls and Dolls: Salem College, Winston-Salem, NC
Young Americans, The High Museum of Art, Atlanta, GA
Young Americans, The Wadsworth Atheneum Museum of Art, Hartford, CT
Suburbia, The Museum of Contemporary Art, Cleveland, Cleveland, OH
Suburbia, Fay Gold Gallery, Atlanta, GA

Collections
 Smithsonian National Museum of African American History, Washington, DC
 Oppenheimer Collection: Nerman Museum of Contemporary Art, Overland, KS
 National Center for Civil and Human Rights, Atlanta, GA
 de Saisset Museum, Santa Clara University, Santa Clara, CA
 BET Collection, New York, NY
 Library of Congress, Washington DC
 Sprint PCS Art Collection, Sprint Corporation, Overland, KS
 The Amistad Center for Art & Culture at The Wadsworth Atheneum Museum of Art, Hartford CT
 Diggs Gallery, Winston-Salem State University, Winston-Salem, NC
 The Paul Jones Collection, Birmingham, AL
 High Museum of Art, Atlanta GA
 Museum of Contemporary Art, Atlanta, GA
 King & Spalding Art Collection, Atlanta GA
 Lucinda Bunnen Photography, Atlanta, GA
 Clark Atlanta University Galleries, Atlanta, GA
 Spelman Museum of Fine Art, Atlanta, GA
 Hammond House Museum, Atlanta GA

Awards, fellowships, and residencies
2019 PNC Bank & WCLK Honor Atlanta's African American Artistic Community, Atlanta, GA
2018 SPE Imagemaker Award,  Cleveland, OH  
2016 Creative Time, Commission, New York, NY 
2016 Campaign for Black Male Achievement Organization, Instagram campaign New York, NY
2016 GM Chevrolet Malibu Commercial, Discover the Unexpected
 2015 Proclamation, Atlanta City Council, Atlanta, GA  
 2015 FluxNightDream2015, Commission, Atlanta, GA
 2014 Museum of Contemporary Art; Working Artist Grant,  Atlanta, GA
 2014 Artist Residency, Reginald F Lewis Museum, Baltimore, MD
 2013 Recipient of Elevate 2013 A Public Art Experience Grant, Atlanta, GA
 2012 Recipient of Idea Capital Grant - Project 1960  Atlanta, GA
 2012 Delta Sigma Theta Celebration of Women Torch Award, Atlanta, GA 
 2010 Save The Art Awards, Greensboro, NC
 2009 The Loridans Arts Encouragement Award, Atlanta, GA
 2008 Artist-in-Residency: The Mozley Park Project, Atlanta, GA
 2008 Aetna Foundation Grant: Artscool, Young Americans Project: Mayor Youth Atlanta, GA
 2007 Artist-in-Residency: Wadsworth Atheneum Museum of Art Hartford, CT
 2006 Santa Fe Prize, Santa Fe Center for Photography, Santa Fe, NM
 2002 Fellow: National Graduate Seminar, The International Photography Institute, NY, NY
 2001 National Bronica Award, Tamron USA, New York, NY
 1999 New Works Photography Award, En Foco, Inc., Bronx, NY

Selected lectures

2019 

 #UNAPOLOGETIC, Public Memory in the New South Symposium | Keynote Speaker, The Halsey Institute of Contemporary Art, Charleston, SC

2018 

 AIPAD,  #1960Now: In  conversation with  Alesia Garza (Co-founder of #BlackLivesMatter global network) New York, NY  
 Art, Atlanta & Activism, Emory University, Atlanta, GA  | Keynote Speaker
 Lets March On:  Lee Friedlander, Boston University, Boston MA
 SPE 55th Annual Conference | Society for Photographic Education, #1960Now Love Movement, Philadelphia, PA Imagemaker Award Presenter
 Forward the Past: Art, Identity, and the American South, Mississippi Museum of Art and Tougaloo College  Jackson, MS
 Rev. Dr. Martin Luther King Freedom Celebration, #1960Now: Social Justice Movements, Past and Present Saint Louis Art Museum  Sanit Louis, MO | Keynote Speaker
 No Fire No Water Could Put Out, High Museum of Art, Atlanta, GA

2017 

 Imperial Origins of Radicalized Lives:  From Enslavement to Black Lives Matter, Brown University, Providence, RI | Presenter
 #1960Now AIPAD 2O17, The Photography Show, New York, NY
 In Conversation with Sheila Pree Bright, ICP, International Center of Photography Museum, New York, NY
 #1960Now,  Heroes, Victories, & Triumphs, NYU Gallatin Gallatin Gallery, New York, NY
 #1960Now, The Center for Civil and Human Rights, Atlanta, GA

2016 

 #1960Now, Project Row Houses, Houston, TX
 ‘#!960Now, Democratization of the Image,  panel discussion Sheila Pree Bright, Ed Kashi, Danny Wilcox   Frazier and Fred Ritchie, ICP, International Center of Photography, New York, NY
 #1960Now, The Creative Time Summit 2016, Under Siege Washington, DC | Presenter
 #1960Now, Click Triangle Photography Festival, Durham, NC
 #1960Now, University of North Carolina, Chapel Hill, NC
 American Civil Rights Then and Now, FotoFocus Biennial, Cincinnati, OH
 #1960Now, LOOK3, Charlottesville, VA
 Black Lives Matter Teach-In, Pratt Institute, Brooklyn, NY  | Keynote Speaker
 Aperture at the New School:  Photography and the Politics of Representation, NY
 Race Racism, Xenophobia In A Global Context A Campus ‘Teach-In,’ NYU, Florence
 (JUST) #SAYHERNAME;  Race and Gender in Social Practice, NYU Tish, New York, NY
 Bridging The Gap:  #1960Now, AUC Woodruff Library, Atlanta, GA
 16th Annual UT Martin Civil Rights Conference Unfinished Business, Martin, TN

References

External links

 Sheila Pree Bright's webpage

American women photographers
Photographers from Georgia (U.S. state)
1967 births
Living people
People from Waycross, Georgia
Artists from Atlanta
21st-century American photographers
21st-century American women artists
University of Missouri alumni
Georgia State University alumni
African-American photographers
African-American women artists
21st-century African-American women
21st-century African-American artists
20th-century African-American people
20th-century African-American women